Dom Juan ou le Festin de pierre ("Don Juan or The Feast of Stone") is a five-act 1665 comedy by Molière based upon the Spanish legend of Don Juan Tenorio. The aristocrat Dom Juan is a rake who seduces, marries, and abandons Elvira, discarded as just another romantic conquest. Later, he invites to dinner the statue of a man whom he recently had murdered; the statue accepts and reciprocates Dom Juan's invitation. In the course of their second evening, the stone statue of the murdered man charms, deceives, and leads Dom Juan to Hell.

Molière's comedy derives from the Spanish play The Trickster of Seville and the Stone Guest (1630), by Tirso de Molina, but each playwright presents a different interpretation of the libertine protagonist. Molière's Dom Juan is a French man who admits to being an atheist and a free-thinker; whereas, de Molina's Don Juan is a Spanish man who admits to being Catholic, and believes that repentance for and forgiveness of sin are possibilities that will admit him to Heaven, but death arrives early, and thwarts his avoiding moral responsibility for a dissolute life; in both the Spanish and the French versions of the comedy, Dom Juan goes to Hell. 

Throughout the plot of Dom Juan or the Feast of the Statue, the valet Sganarelle is the only character who defends religion, but his superstitious Catholicism is a thematic and intellectual foil to Dom Juan's free-thinking disregard for religion and social and sexual norms. In early 1665, after fifteen performances of the original run of Dom Juan, the French royal authorities halted performances of the play; Molière then had to defend the play and himself against accusations of irreligiousity and political subversion. That the playwright Molière was celebrating a libertine life by positively portraying a rake, thus the intent of the play is disrespectful of the official doctrine of the Church, and thus subversive of the royal authority of the king of France, who is an absolute monarch. The consequent state-and-church censorship legally compelled Molière to delete socially subversive scenes and irreligious dialogue from the script, specifically the scene where Sganarelle and Dom Juan encounter the Pauper in the forest, in Act III.

In 1682, the prose edition of Dom Juan ou le Festin de pierre was censored, with paper strips glued upon the offensive text, for inclusion to an eight-volume edition of the plays of Molière. The censored, verse edition Le Festin de pierre (1677) by Thomas Corneille changed the style of writing — and thus changed the intent of the play — by exaggerating Dom Juan's libertinism to render Molière's comedy of manners into a cautionary tale of the unhappy fate of irreligious people.

Plot

Dom Juan or The Feast with the Statue (1665) presents the story of the last two days of life of the Sicilian courtier Dom Juan Tenorio, who is a young, libertine aristocrat known as a seducer of women and as an atheist. Throughout the story, Dom Juan is accompanied by his valet, Sganarelle, a truculent and superstitious, cowardly and greedy man who engages his master in intellectual debates. The many facets of Dom Juan's personality are exposed to show that he is an adulterer (Act I); an accomplished womanizer (Act II); an altruistic, religious non-conformist (Act III); a spendthrift, bad son to his father (Act IV); and a religious hypocrite who pretends a spiritual rebirth and return to the faith of the Roman Catholic Church, which is foiled by death (Act V).

Synopsis

Act I
In the garden of the palace. After a few words of appreciation for snuff tobacco, Sganarelle speaks with Guzmán, the squire to Done Elvire. Her primary concern is the abrupt departure of her new husband, Dom Juan. For Guzmán, Sganarelle proudly paints a terrible portrait of his master, Dom Juan, as a fickle, cynical disbeliever whom women should distrust. Guzmán exits and Dom Juan enters to argue with Sganarelle about the topic of marriage and amorous inconstancy, before revealing that he has fallen in love and has his sight set on someone new — a young, rustic bride-to-be. Done Elvire then enters to challenge Dom Juan to explain the reasons for his abrupt departure; his response leaves her angered.

Act II
In the countryside. Speaking in rustic vernacular, the peasant Pierrot tells his bride, Charlotte, of the adventure story of his rescue of Dom Juan and Sganarelle after they had fallen into the lake when their boat capsized. Pierrot then exits to go "wet his whistle", and Dom Juan and Sganarelle appear. Dom Juan tells Charlotte that he is in love with her, and persuades her to marry him. As Dom Juan is about to kiss Charlotte's hand a thousand times, Pierrot returns and intervenes. Then appears Mathurine, yet another woman Dom Juan promised to marry. Two fiancées, and both demand an explanation. Dom Juan manages to inveigle his way out of girl trouble, leaving each woman believing that all is well between him and her. A man enters with the news that Dom Juan is in danger — twelve men on horseback are looking for him. Dom Juan says to Sganarelle that they should exchange clothes with each other. Sganarelle says "Not likely.", and they hurry off.

Act III
In the forest. Enter Dom Juan in country costume and Sganarelle in doctor costume. They are lost and encounter a pauper dressed in rags, and ask him for directions through the forest. Learning that the pauper is religious and devout, Dom Juan tests the man's faith by offering him a gold piece to blaspheme; the pauper refuses. Then Dom Juan sees a gentleman being attacked by three robbers, so he draws his sword and goes to his rescue. The gentleman turns out to be Dom Carlos, a brother of Done Elvire, who explains to Dom Juan that he and his brother, Dom Alonso, have been hunting for Dom Juan to avenge his seduction of their sister. Pretending ignorance, and not admitting his identity, Dom Juan says he knows Dom Juan but that he is only an acquaintance, not a friend. Dom Alonso arrives. He recognizes Dom Juan and demands immediate revenge. In gratitude to Dom Juan for saving him from robbers, Dom Carlos persuades his brother, Dom Alonso, to postpone his revenge. The brothers exit. Continuing on their way in the forest, Dom Juan and Sganarelle find themselves at the tomb of the Commander, a man recently killed by Dom Juan. He orders Sganarelle to invite the statue of the Commander to dinner. The stone statue nods his head to the valet.

Act IV
In his apartment, Dom Juan wants to sit for dinner, but he is interrupted by a series of unannounced visitors. First is the creditor Monsieur Dimanche, a tradesman whom Dom Juan placates with many compliments, but then he snubs Dimanche by suddenly exiting the room. Sganarelle enters to usher out Dimanche from the apartment. Dom Juan's father Dom Louis arrives. He scolds Dom Juan and then leaves, angry with contempt. Donna Elvira enters, no longer furious, but with loving, wifely spirit to warn her husband against the wrath of Heaven. She attempts in vain to persuade Dom Juan to repent his sins. She leaves him alone. Finally, Dom Juan and Sganarelle sit to dinner, when the statue of the Commander appears; he does not join them at the table, but he does invite Dom Juan to sup with him the following day.

Act V
In the countryside near the city, Dom Juan tells his father that Heaven has changed him and that he has renounced his wicked ways. Happy at hearing that news from his son, Dom Louis leaves. The news of repentance and reformation also delight Sganarelle, but Dom Juan immediately says he meant none of it, and then passionately speaks at length in praise of hypocrisy. Then Dom Carlos appears, and a duel appears inevitable. 

The spectre of a veiled woman appears to offer Dom Juan a final opportunity to repent his sins. Dom Juan draws and brandishes his sword at the spectral woman, and he refuses to repent. The statue of the Commander enters, proclaiming: "The wages of sin is death". At that moment, Dom Juan cries out that he is burning, that he is afire. Thunder and lightning sound and flash, and the earth breaks open to swallow Dom Juan, whose fall is followed by flames. Seeing that his master is gone, the lonely valet Sganarelle bewails the loss of his wages.

Characters and premiere cast

{| class="wikitable"
!Character
!Cast of the play's premiere performance (15 February 1665)
|-
| Dom Juan, son of Dom Louis
| La Grange
|-
| Sganarelle, servant to Dom Juan 
 |Molière
|-
| Donna Elvira, wife of Dom Juan
| Mademoiselle Du Parc
|-
| Guzmán, gentleman-usher to Donna Elvira
| 
|-
| Dom Carlos, brother of Donna Elvira
| 
|-
| Dom Alonzo, brother of Donna Elvira
| 
|-
| Dom Louis, father of Dom Juan
| Louis Bejart
|-
| Charlotte, a peasant woman, fiancée to Pierrot| Mademoiselle de Brie
|-
| Mathurine, a peasant woman| Mademoiselle Molière
|-
| Pierrot, a peasant| André Hubert
|-
| A Pauper
| possibly La Thorillière?
|-
| The Statue of the Commander
| possibly La Thorillière?
|-
| Violette, servant to Dom Juan| 
|-
| Ragotin, servant to Dom Juan| 
|-
| Monsieur Dimanche, a tradesman| Du Croisy (Philibert Gassot)
|-
| La Ramée, a swashbuckler| De Brie (Edmé Villequin)
|-
| A Ghost (in the form of a veiled woman)
| possibly Madeleine Béjart?
|}

Folkloristics
In folkloristics, the theme of a living human recklessly inviting a dead person or skull for dinner is classified in the Aarne-Thompson-Uther Index as ATU 470A, "The Offended Skull".Pedrosa, José Manuel. "El mito de don Juan y el cuento tradicional de "El cadáver ofendido" (ATU 470A)". In: Hecho teatral. vol. 7 (2007). Castilla y León (España), Valladolid: Universitas Castellae. 2007. pp. 63-90. 

Notes

Further reading
 Mackay, Dorothy Epplen. The Double Invitation In the Legend of Don Juan. Stanford University, Calif.: Stanford University Press, 1943.

External links

 Le Festin de Pierre, comedie. Par J.B.P. de Moliere, edition nouvelle & toute differente de celle qui a paru jusqu'à present. A page-by-page view of the antique book that contains the text of the play as it was published in Amsterdam in 1683''
 Dual language publication of the play, French and English, every other page, dated 1739.
   The text of Dom Juan available online in English translation

 Film based on the play
 Free Online 2010 American Translation

Plays by Molière
1665 plays
Works based on the Don Juan legend
Plays set in Sicily